James Welsh may refer to:

James C. Welsh (1880–1954), Scottish Labour Party politician, Member of Parliament (MP) for Coatbridge 1922–1931, and Bothwell 1935–1945.
James Welsh (East India Company officer) (1775–1861), army officer in the East India Company
James Welsh (Paisley MP) (1881–1969), Scottish Labour Party politician, MP for Paisley 1929–1931
James Welsh (Medal of Honor) (1846–1916), American Civil War Medal of Honor recipient
James Welsh (rower) (1931–1963), American Olympic rower
Jimmy Welsh (1902–1970), American baseball player
Jim Welsh, James Edward (1902–1958), American football player

See also
James Welch (disambiguation)